Ejby is a town with a population of 1,978 (1 January 2022) in Lejre Municipality, Region Zealand in Denmark.

Geography
Ejby is located at the base of Hornsherred, on the southwestern corner of the peninsula, near the southeastern shore of the Isefjord between Holbæk and Roskilde.

Notable people 

 Helena Heuser (born 1996 in Ejby) a Danish model and beauty pageant titleholder, crowned Miss World Denmark 2016

References

Cities and towns in Region Zealand
Lejre Municipality